Born Nov 30, 1957, Helmuth Hennig() finished his formal education in Denmark in 1977 and furthered his studies at the University of Illinois, US in 1987.

At the start of his career, he joined the German shipping company Hapag-Lloyd, Hamburg as executive trainee for two and a half years, after which he was assigned to the liner operations Australia/New Zealand as assistant marketing manager.

In 1983, he joined Jebsen Group in Hong Kong as assistant division manager of the shipping division, where he was responsible for the Europe/Asia trade operations. He was later transferred to the technical division as assistant general manager in charge of the China sales operations. During that period, he spent an extensive period of time in China.

In 1990 he joined Jebsen’s Group Management as general manager - corporate development. He was made a board director in 1994. In early 1997 he was appointed group deputy managing director and then in 2000 promoted to his current position of group managing director, looking after the Group’s overall business operations, strategies and development.

In addition to his company functions, he has served on the boards of various non-profit organisations in Hong Kong, including three years as chairman of the German Swiss International School’s Board of Governors.

Today, he is the chairman of The Photographic Heritage Foundation and the Executive Committee of Outward Bound Hong Kong and Council/Executive Committee Member of The Hong Kong Management Association. He has also been conferred the honorary title of guest professor for the Business School of Jilin University in Apr 2013.

He is an avid yachtsman, and married with three children.

References

External links
 Jebsen Group

Living people
Hong Kong chief executives
1957 births